The 2017–18 Utah Jazz season was the 44th season of the franchise in the National Basketball Association (NBA), and the 39th season of the franchise in Salt Lake City. On the 4th of July, Gordon Hayward announced his departure from the Jazz and signed with the Boston Celtics. Despite that, the Jazz clinched a playoff berth for the second straight year after defeating the Los Angeles Lakers on April 8, 2018.

They finished the regular season with 48–34, which clinched the 5th seed. In the playoffs, the Jazz faced the 4th seeded Oklahoma City Thunder in the First Round, winning in six games and advancing to the Semifinals for the second consecutive season, where they faced the top-seeded Houston Rockets, losing in five games.

Draft picks

Roster

Uniforms

Standings

Division

Conference

Game log

Preseason

|- style="background:#cfc;"
| 1
| October 2
| Sydney
| 
| Rodney Hood (18)
| Rudy Gobert (10)
| Joe Ingles (5)
| Vivint Smart Home Arena15,692
| 1—0
|- style="background:#cfc;"
| 2
| October 4
| Maccabi Haifa
| 
| Alec Burks (16)
| Alec Burks (8)
| Dante Exum (6)
| Vivint Smart Home Arena14,126
| 2–0
|- style="background:#cfc;"
| 3
| October 6
| Phoenix
| 
| Burks, Hood (19)
| Rudy Gobert (12)
| Gobert, Joe Johnson, Udoh (3)
| Vivint Smart Home Arena17,196
| 3–0
|- style="background:#cfc;"
| 4
| October 9
| @ Phoenix
| 
| Ricky Rubio (20)
| Derrick Favors (6)
| Alec Burks (5)
| Talking Stick Resort Arena7,643
| 4–0
|- style="background:#cfc;"
| 5
| October 10
| @ L.A. Lakers
| 
| Rudy Gobert (29)
| Rudy Gobert (13)
| Ricky Rubio (6)
| Staples Center15,054
| 5–0

Regular season

|- style="background:#cfc;"
| 1
| October 18
| Denver
| 
| Rudy Gobert (18)
| Rudy Gobert (10)
| Ricky Rubio (10)
| Vivint Smart Home Arena17,588
| 1–0
|- style="background:#fcc;"
| 2
| October 20
| @ Minnesota
| 
| Rodney Hood (20)
| Rudy Gobert (18)
| Ricky Rubio (10)
| Target Center18,978
| 1–1
|- style="background:#cfc;"
| 3
| October 21
| Oklahoma City
| 
| Joe Ingles (19)
| Rudy Gobert (13)
| Donovan Mitchell (6)
| Vivint Smart Home Arena18,300
| 2–1
|- style="background:#fcc;"
| 4
| October 24
| @ L.A. Clippers
| 
| Donovan Mitchell (19)
| Thabo Sefolosha (12)
| Ricky Rubio (5)
| Staples Center16,607
| 2–2
|- style="background:#fcc;"
| 5
| October 25
| @ Phoenix
| 
| Rodney Hood (22)
| Rudy Gobert (14)
| Ricky Rubio (11)
| Talking Stick Resort Arena16,022
| 2–3
|- style="background:#cfc;"
| 6
| October 28
| L.A. Lakers
| 
| Donovan Mitchell (22)
| Derrick Favors (10)
| Ingles, Johnson, Rubio (4)
| Vivint Smart Home Arena18,306
| 3–3
|- style="background:#cfc;"
| 7
| October 30
| Dallas
| 
| Rodney Hood (25)
| Rudy Gobert (12)
| Gobert, Ingles, Rubio (6)
| Vivint Smart Home Arena16,221
| 4–3

|- style="background:#cfc;"
| 8
| November 1
| Portland
| 
| Ricky Rubio (30)
| Rudy Gobert (10)
| Joe Ingles (5)
| Vivint Smart Home Arena16,685
| 5–3
|- style="background:#fcc;"
| 9
| November 3
| Toronto
| 
| Donovan Mitchell (25)
| Favors, Gobert (7)
| Joe Ingles (6)
| Vivint Smart Home Arena16,258
| 5–4
|- style="background:#fcc;"
| 10
| November 5
| @ Houston
| 
| Donovan Mitchell (17)
| Rudy Gobert (5)
| Donovan Mitchell (4)
| Toyota Center16,914
| 5–5
|- style="background:#fcc;"
| 11
| November 7
| Philadelphia
| 
| Rodney Hood (19)
| Rudy Gobert (15)
| Ricky Rubio (8)
| Vivint Smart Home Arena16,063
| 5–6
|- style="background:#fcc;"
| 12
| November 10
| Miami
| 
| Rodney Hood (19)
| Rudy Gobert (12)
| Joe Ingles (5)
| Vivint Smart Home Arena18,306
| 5–7
|- style="background:#cfc;"
| 13
| November 11
| Brooklyn
| 
| Donovan Mitchell (26)
| Derrick Favors (12)
| Ricky Rubio (8)
| Vivint Smart Home Arena17,413
| 6–7
|- style="background:#fcc;"
| 14
| November 13
| Minnesota
| 
| Donovan Mitchell (24)
| Derrick Favors (10)
| Joe Ingles (5)
| Vivint Smart Home Arena17,236
| 6–8
|- style="background:#fcc;"
| 15
| November 15
| @ New York
| 
| Rodney Hood (30)
| Derrick Favors (10)
| Derrick Favors (5)
| Madison Square Garden18,695
| 6–9
|- style="background:#fcc;"
| 16
| November 17
| @ Brooklyn
| 
| Raul Neto (22)
| Favors, Mitchell, O'Neale (7)
| Donovan Mitchell (8)
| Barclays Center14,495
| 6–10
|- style="background:#cfc;"
| 17
| November 18
| @ Orlando
| 
| Derrick Favors (25)
| Derrick Favors (11)
| Raul Neto (7)
| Amway Center19,157
| 7–10
|- style="background:#fcc;"
| 18
| November 20
| @ Philadelphia
| 
| Donovan Mitchell (17)
| Derrick Favors (7)
| Donovan Mitchell (5)
| Wells Fargo Center20,587
| 7–11
|- style="background:#cfc;"
| 19
| November 22
| Chicago
| 
| Derrick Favors (23)
| Derrick Favors (7)
| Donovan Mitchell (7)
| Vivint Smart Home Arena17,434
| 8–11
|- style="background:#cfc;"
| 20
| November 25
| Milwaukee
| 
| Donovan Mitchell (24)
| Derrick Favors (6)
| Joe Ingles (9)
| Vivint Smart Home Arena17,298
| 9–11
|- style="background:#cfc;"
| 21
| November 28
| Denver
| 
| Derrick Favors (24)
| Derrick Favors (9)
| Joe Ingles (6)
| Vivint Smart Home Arena16,790
| 10–11
|- style="background:#cfc;"
| 22
| November 30
| @ L.A. Clippers
| 
| Alec Burks (28)
| Derrick Favors (12)
| Mitchell, Ingles, Rubio (6)
| Staples Center15,139
| 11–11

|- style="background:#cfc;"
| 23
| December 1
| New Orleans
| 
| Donovan Mitchell (41)
| Derrick Favors (11)
| Joe Ingles (7)
| Vivint Smart Home Arena17,725
| 12–11
|- style="background:#cfc;"
| 24
| December 4
| Washington
| 
| Alec Burks (27)
| Rudy Gobert (10)
| Royce O'Neale (6)
| Vivint Smart Home Arena17,227
| 13–11
|- style="background:#fcc;"
| 25
| December 5
| @ Oklahoma City
| 
| Donovan Mitchell (31)
| Thabo Sefolosha (8)
| Burks, Rubio (6)
| Chesapeake Energy Arena18,203
| 13–12
|- style="background:#fcc;"
| 26
| December 7
| Houston
| 
| Donovan Mitchell (26)
| Rudy Gobert (9)
| Mitchell, Ingles (4)
| Vivint Smart Home Arena18,306
| 13–13
|- style="background:#fcc;"
| 27
| December 9
| @ Milwaukee
| 
| Burks, Gobert (20)
| Rudy Gobert (9)
| Ricky Rubio (7)
| Bradley Center16,675
| 13–14
|- style="background:#fcc"
| 28
| December 13
| @ Chicago
| 
| Donovan Mitchell (32)
| Rudy Gobert (11)
| Donovan Mitchell (6)
| United Center18,102
| 13–15
|- style="background:#cfc;"
| 29
| December 15
| @ Boston
| 
| Ricky Rubio (22)
| Ekpe Udoh (9)
| Donovan Mitchell (9)
| TD Garden18,624
| 14–15
|- style="background:#fcc"
| 30
| December 16
| @ Cleveland
| 
| Donovan Mitchell (26)
| Ekpe Udoh (7)
| Joe Ingles (9)
| Quicken Loans Arena20,562
| 14–16
|- style="background:#fcc;"
| 31
| December 18
| @ Houston
| 
| Rodney Hood (26)
| Jerebko, Udoh (5)
| Hood, Ingles, Rubio (4)
| Toyota Center18,055
| 14–17
|- style="background:#fcc;"
| 32
| December 20
| @ Oklahoma City
| 
| Rodney Hood (17)
| Jonas Jerebko (8)
| Alec Burks (4)
| Chesapeake Energy Arena18,203
| 14–18
|- style="background:#cfc;"
| 33
| December 21
| San Antonio
| 
| Rodney Hood (29)
| Ricky Rubio (11)
| Ricky Rubio (7)
| Vivint Smart Home Arena18,306
| 15–18
|- style="background:#fcc;"
| 34
| December 23
| Oklahoma City
| 
| Donovan Mitchell (29)
| Favors, Ingles (8)
| Ingles, Rubio (5)
| Vivint Smart Home Arena18,306
| 15–19
|- style="background:#fcc;"
| 35
| December 26
| @ Denver
| 
| Derrick Favors (20)
| Rubio, Ingles (7)
| Ricky Rubio (7)
| Pepsi Center17,104
| 15–20
|- style="background:#fcc;"
| 36
| December 27
| @ Golden State
| 
| Rodney Hood (26)
| Derrick Favors (10)
| Joe Ingles (7)
| Oracle Arena19,596
| 15–21
|- style="background:#cfc;"
| 37
| December 30
| Cleveland
| 
| Donovan Mitchell (29)
| Thabo Sefolosha (12)
| Ricky Rubio (8)
| Vivint Smart Home Arena18,306
| 16–21

|- style="background:#fcc;"
| 38
| January 3
| New Orleans
| 
| Donovan Mitchell (24)
| Derrick Favors (9)
| Ricky Rubio (7)
| Vivint Smart Home Arena18,306
| 16–22
|- style="background:#fcc;"
| 39
| January 5
| @ Denver
| 
| Mitchell, Rubio (15)
| Derrick Favors (10)
| Joe Ingles (9)
| Pepsi Center15,557
| 16–23
|- style="background:#fcc;"
| 40
| January 7
| @ Miami
| 
| Donovan Mitchell (27)
| Derrick Favors (10)
| Ricky Rubio (6)
| American Airlines Arena19,600
| 16–24
|- style="background:#cfc;"
| 41
| January 10
| @ Washington
| 
| Ricky Rubio (21)
| Ekpe Udoh (9)
| Joe Ingles (6)
| Capital One Arena15,640
| 17–24
|- style="background:#fcc;"
| 42
| January 12
| @ Charlotte
| 
| Donovan Mitchell (35)
| Royce O'Neale (10)
| Joe Ingles (6)
| Spectrum Center14,848
| 17–25
|- style="background:#fcc;"
| 43
| January 15
| Indiana
| 
| Donovan Mitchell (23)
| Derrick Favors (7)
| Raul Neto (3)
| Vivint Smart Home Arena18,306
| 17–26
|- style="background:#cfc;"
| 44
| January 17
| @ Sacramento
| 
| Donovan Mitchell (34)
| Derrick Favors (11)
| Ricky Rubio (7)
| Golden 1 Center17,583
| 18–26
|- style="background:#fcc;"
| 45
| January 19
| NY Knicks
| 
| Rudy Gobert (23)
| Rudy Gobert (14)
| Donovan Mitchell (7)
| Vivint Smart Home Arena18,306
| 18–27
|- style="background:#cfc;"
| 46
| January 20
| L.A. Clippers
| 
| Donovan Mitchell (23)
| Derrick Favors (12)
| Donovan Mitchell (7)
| Vivint Smart Home Arena18,306
| 19–27
|- style="background:#fcc;"
| 47
| January 22
| @ Atlanta
| 
| Alec Burks (17)
| Rudy Gobert (10)
| Ricky Rubio (6)
| Philips Arena11,096
| 19–28
|- style="background:#cfc;"
| 48
| January 24
| @ Detroit
| 
| Gobert, Mitchell (15)
| Favors, Rubio (10)
| Joe Ingles (7)
| Little Caesars Arena15,682
| 20–28
|- style="background:#cfc;"
| 49
| January 26
| @ Toronto
| 
| Donovan Mitchell (26)
| Rudy Gobert (15)
| Ricky Rubio (6)
| Air Canada Centre19,800
| 21–28
|- style="background:#cfc;"
| 50
| January 30
| Golden State
| 
| Ricky Rubio (23)
| Derrick Favors (10)
| Ricky Rubio (11)
| Vivint Smart Home Arena18,306
| 22–28

|- style="background:#cfc;"
| 51
| February 2
| @ Phoenix
| 
| Donovan Mitchell (40)
| Derrick Favors (10)
| Ricky Rubio (9)
| Talking Stick Resort Arena16,560
| 23–28
|- style="background:#cfc;"
| 52
| February 3
| @ San Antonio
| 
| Ricky Rubio (34)
| Rudy Gobert (10)
| Ricky Rubio (9)
| AT&T Center18,418
| 24–28
|- style="background:#cfc;"
| 53
| February 5
| @ New Orleans
| 
| Rodney Hood (30)
| Rudy Gobert (10)
| Ricky Rubio (11)
| Smoothie King Center14,293
| 25–28
|- style="background:#cfc;"
| 54
| February 7
| @ Memphis
| 
| Ricky Rubio (29)
| Rudy Gobert (12)
| Joe Ingles (4)
| FedExForum13,187
| 26–28
|- style="background:#cfc;"
| 55
| February 9
| Charlotte
| 
| Donovan Mitchell (25)
| Rudy Gobert (11)
| Ricky Rubio (7)
| Vivint Smart Home Arena18,306
| 27–28
|- style="background:#cfc;"
| 56
| February 11
| @ Portland
| 
| Donovan Mitchell (27)
| Favors, Gobert, O'Neale (11)
| Royce O'Neale (6)
| Moda Center19,730
| 28–28
|- style="background:#cfc;"
| 57
| February 12
| San Antonio
| 
| Donovan Mitchell (25)
| Rudy Gobert (11)
| Ingles, Mitchell (5)
| Vivint Smart Home Arena18,306
| 29–28
|- style="background:#cfc;"
| 58
| February 14
| Phoenix
| 
| Donovan Mitchell (24)
| Rudy Gobert (17)
| Donovan Mitchell (7)
| Vivint Smart Home Arena18,306
| 30–28
|- align="center"
|colspan="9" bgcolor="#bbcaff"|All-Star Break
|- style="background:#fcc;"
| 59
| February 23
| Portland
| 
| Donovan Mitchell (21)
| Derrick Favors (9)
| Royce O'Neale (4)
| Vivint Smart Home Arena18,306
| 30–29
|- style="background:#cfc;"
| 60
| February 24
| Dallas
| 
| Donovan Mitchell (25)
| Rudy Gobert (10)
| Joe Ingles (8)
| Vivint Smart Home Arena18,306
| 31–29
|- style="background:#fcc;"
| 61
| February 26
| Houston
| 
| Rudy Gobert (17)
| Derrick Favors (7)
| Rubio, Crowder (5)
| Vivint Smart Home Arena18,306
| 31–30

|- style="background:#cfc;"
| 62
| March 2
| Minnesota
| 
| Gobert, Mitchell (26)
| Rudy Gobert (16)
| Ricky Rubio (7)
| Vivint Smart Home Arena18,306
| 32–30
|- style="background:#cfc;"
| 63
| March 3
| @ Sacramento
| 
| Donovan Mitchell (27)
| Rudy Gobert (12)
| Ricky Rubio (6)
| Golden 1 Center17,583
| 33–30
|- style="background:#cfc;"
| 64
| March 5
| Orlando
| 
| Rudy Gobert (21)
| Rudy Gobert (17)
| Ricky Rubio (8)
| Vivint Smart Home Arena18,306
| 34–30　
|- style="background:#cfc;"
| 65
| March 7
| @ Indiana
| 
| Rudy Gobert (23)
| Rudy Gobert (14)
| Joe Ingles (10)
| Bankers Life Fieldhouse16,432
| 35–30
|- style="background:#cfc;"
| 66
| March 9
| @ Memphis
| 
| Jae Crowder (22)
| Gobert, Rubio (10)
| Donovan Mitchell (6)
| FedExForum15,622
| 36–30
|- style="background:#cfc;"
| 67
| March 11
| @ New Orleans
| 
| Ricky Rubio (30)
| Rudy Gobert (16)
| Ricky Rubio (7)
| Smoothie King Center18,062
| 37–30
|- style="background:#cfc;"
| 68
| March 13
| Detroit
| 
| Rudy Gobert (22)
| Rudy Gobert (12)
| Ricky Rubio (9)
| Vivint Smart Home Arena18,306
| 38–30
|- style="background:#cfc;"
| 69
| March 15
| Phoenix
| 
| Donovan Mitchell (23)
| Rudy Gobert (13)
| Ricky Rubio (11)
| Vivint Smart Home Arena18,306
| 39–30
|- style="background:#cfc;"
| 70
| March 17
| Sacramento
| 
| Donovan Mitchell (28)
| Rudy Gobert (13)
| Ricky Rubio (5)
| Vivint Smart Home Arena18,306
| 40–30
|- style="background:#fcc;"
| 71
| March 20
| Atlanta
| 
| Donovan Mitchell (24)
| Rudy Gobert (16)
| Joe Ingles (7)
| Vivint Smart Home Arena18,306
| 40–31
|- style="background:#cfc;"
| 72
| March 22
| @ Dallas
| 
| Donovan Mitchell (26)
| Favors, Gobert (7)
| Joe Ingles (7)
| American Airlines Center19,725
| 41–31
|- style="background:#fcc;"
| 73
| March 23
| @ San Antonio
| 
| Donovan Mitchell (35)
| Favors, Gobert (8)
| Ricky Rubio (9)
| AT&T Center18,418
| 41–32
|- style="background:#cfc;"
| 74
| March 25
| @ Golden State
| 
| Donovan Mitchell (21)
| Rudy Gobert (15)
| Donovan Mitchell (6)
| Oracle Arena19,596
| 42–32
|- style="background:#fcc;"
| 75
| March 28
| Boston
| 
| Donovan Mitchell (22)
| Rudy Gobert (11)
| Ricky Rubio (10)
| Vivint Smart Home Arena18,306
| 42–33
|- style="background:#cfc;"
| 76
| March 30
| Memphis
| 
| Donovan Mitchell (22)
| Rudy Gobert (10)
| Joe Ingles (10)
| Vivint Smart Home Arena18,306
| 43–33

|- style="background:#cfc;"
| 77
| April 1
| @ Minnesota
| 
| Ricky Rubio (23)
| Rudy Gobert (13)
| Dante Exum (5)
| Target Center18,978
| 44–33
|- style="background:#cfc;"
| 78
| April 3
| L.A. Lakers
| 
| Ricky Rubio (31)
| Rudy Gobert (16)
| Ricky Rubio (8)
| Vivint Smart Home Arena18,306
| 45–33
|- style="background:#cfc;"
| 79
| April 5
| L.A. Clippers
| 
| Donovan Mitchell (19)
| Rudy Gobert (10)
| Joe Ingles (9)
| Vivint Smart Home Arena18,306
| 46–33
|- style="background:#cfc;"
| 80
| April 8
| @ L.A. Lakers
| 
| Donovan Mitchell (28)
| Derrick Favors (13)
| Joe Ingles (10)
| Staples Center18,997
| 47–33
|- style="background:#cfc;"
| 81
| April 10
| Golden State
| 
| Donovan Mitchell (22)
| Derrick Favors (9)
| Joe Ingles (8)
| Vivint Smart Home Arena18,306
| 48–33
|- style="background:#fcc;"
| 82
| April 11
| @ Portland
| 
| Mitchell, Rubio (17)
| Rudy Gobert (13)
| Mitchell, Rubio (5)
| Moda Center 20,186
| 48–34

Playoffs

|- style="background:#fcc;"
| 1
| April 15
| @ Oklahoma City
| 
| Donovan Mitchell (27)
| Donovan Mitchell (10)
| Ricky Rubio (5)
| Chesapeake Energy Arena18,203
| 0–1
|- style="background:#cfc;"
| 2
| April 18
| @ Oklahoma City
| 
| Donovan Mitchell (28)
| Derrick Favors (16)
| Ricky Rubio (9)
| Chesapeake Energy Arena18,203
| 1–1
|- style="background:#cfc;"
| 3
| April 21
| Oklahoma City
| 
| Ricky Rubio (26)
| Rudy Gobert (12)
| Ricky Rubio (10)
| Vivint Smart Home Arena18,306
| 2–1
|- style="background:#cfc"
| 4
| April 23
| Oklahoma City
| 
| Donovan Mitchell (33)
| Rudy Gobert (10)
| Ricky Rubio (8)
| Vivint Smart Home Arena18,306
| 3–1
|- style="background:#fcc;"
| 5
| April 25
| @ Oklahoma City
| 
| Jae Crowder (27)
| Ricky Rubio (12)
| Ricky Rubio (7)
| Chesapeake Energy Arena18,203
| 3–2
|- style="background:#cfc;"
| 6
| April 27
| Oklahoma City
| 
| Donovan Mitchell (38)
| Rudy Gobert (13)
| Joe Ingles (5)
| Vivint Smart Home Arena18,306
| 4–2

|- style="background:#fcc;"
| 1
| April 29
| @ Houston
| 
| Crowder, Mitchell (21)
| Rudy Gobert (9)
| Ingles, Mitchell (5)
| Toyota Center18,055
| 0–1
|- style="background:#cfc;"
| 2
| May 2
| @ Houston
| 
| Joe Ingles (27)
| Rudy Gobert (14)
| Donovan Mitchell (11)
| Toyota Center18,055
| 1–1
|- style="background:#fcc;"
| 3
| May 4
| Houston
| 
| Royce O'Neale (17)
| Rudy Gobert (9)
| Raul Neto (4)
| Vivint Smart Home Arena18,306
| 1–2
|- style="background:#fcc;"
| 4
| May 6
| Houston
| 
| Donovan Mitchell (25)
| Rudy Gobert (10)
| Joe Ingles (4)
| Vivint Smart Home Arena18,306
| 1–3
|- style="background:#fcc;"
| 5
| May 8
| @ Houston
| 
| Donovan Mitchell (24)
| Rudy Gobert (9)
| Donovan Mitchell (9)
| Toyota Center18,055
| 1–4

Transactions

Trades

Free agency

Additions from non-NBA players

Additions

Subtractions

On July 7, 2018, Jonas Jerebko was waived by the Jazz, and picked up by the Golden State Warriors.

References

2017-18
2017–18 NBA season by team
2017 in sports in Utah
2018 in sports in Utah